Novosoldatka is a rural locality (a selo) and the administrative center of Novosoldatskoye Rural Settlement, Repyovsky District, Voronezh Oblast, Russia. The population was 849 as of 2010. There are 14 streets.

Geography 
Novosoldatka is located 24 km northeast of Repyovka (the district's administrative centre) by road. Krasnolipye is the nearest rural locality.

References 

Rural localities in Repyovsky District